Catanduvense may refer to:

 A resident of Catanduva, São Paulo, Brazil
 Grêmio Catanduvense de Futebol, a Brazilian football club founded 1999
 Grêmio Esportivo Catanduvense, a defunct Brazilian football club, active 1970–1993